Leslie William Filkins, Jr. (born September 14, 1956 in Chicago, Illinois) is a former professional baseball outfielder who played professionally from 1975 to 1983. Filkins was drafted by the Detroit Tigers with the third pick of the 1975 Major League Baseball Draft. He played in Detroit's minor league system from 1975 until 1982. He made it as far as Triple A. He batted .255 in his 8 years in the minors, with 60 home runs and 328 runs batted in. In 1983, Filkins played for the Hiroshima Toyo Carp in the Central League.

External links

Nippon Professional Baseball career statistics from Baseball-Reference

1956 births
Living people
American expatriate baseball players in Japan
Nippon Professional Baseball pitchers
Hiroshima Toyo Carp players
Clinton Pilots players
Bristol Tigers players
Lakeland Tigers players
Montgomery Rebels players
Evansville Triplets players